Patrick Savage is an Australian-born composer and violinist best known for his collaboration with Holeg Spies on the score for The Human Centipede (First Sequence).

He was also formerly principal first violin with the Royal Philharmonic Orchestra in London, UK.  A former student of the Victorian College of the Arts in Melbourne and the Royal College of Music in London, he now lives in London and collaborates regularly on scores with French composer Holeg Spies.

He was also formerly leader of the Tippett Quartet in London.

Filmography
 Hex
 Selling Isobel
 Purple Heather
 The Raven Club
 The Outsider (James Caan, Shannon Elizabeth, Craig Fairbrass, Jason Patric, dir Brian A Miller)
 Invizimals: The Lost Kingdom (game for Sony PlayStation 3)
 Tarot (in development)
 Becoming (dir Omar Naim, in pre-production)
 Abruptio (dir Evan Marlowe)
 Stolen Light
 Asylum 108
 Se vende perro que habla, 10 euros
 Dead End
 LA I Hate You (additional music)
 American Maniacs
 Holy Monks (animated television series)
 Jack of Diamonds (television film)
 The Human Centipede (First Sequence)
 Shadowland
 The Ugly File
 I Do
  Peekers
 Dead@17
  4 Conversations About Love

References

External links
 
 Savage-Spies.com

1976 births
Australian film score composers
Male film score composers
Living people